This is a list of the world's longest wooden ships. The vessels are sorted by ship length including bowsprit, if known.

Finding the world's longest wooden ship is not straightforward since there are several contenders, depending on which definitions are used. For example, some of these ships benefited from substantial iron or even steel components since the flexing of wood members can lead to significant leaking as the wood members become longer. Some of these ships were not very seaworthy, and a few sank either immediately after launch or soon thereafter. Some of the more recent large ships were never able or intended to leave their berths, and function as floating museums. Finally, not all of the claims to the title of the world's longest wooden ship are credible or verifiable.

A further problem is that especially wooden ships have more than one "length". The most used measure in length for registering a ship is the "length of the topmost deck" — the "length on deck" (LOD) — 'measured from leading edge of stem post to trailing edge of stern post on deck level' or the "length between perpendiculars" (LPP, LBP) — 'measured from leading edge of stem post to trailing edge of stern post in the construction waterline (CWL)'. In this method of measuring bowsprit including jibboom and out-board part of spanker boom if any have both no effect on the ship's length. The longest length for comparing ships, the total "overall" length (LOA) based on sparred length, should be given if known.

The -difference is due to her extremely long jibboom of  her out-board length being .

Longest known wooden ships

Over 100 meters (328 feet)

100–90 meters (328–295 feet)

89-80 meters (291-262 feet)

79–70 meters (259–230 feet)

69–60 meters (226–197 feet)

59–56 meters (193–184 feet)

Longest wooden ships by ensign

Claimed but poorly documented

Longest still in existence

Over 56 meters (184 feet)

56–40 meters (184–131 feet)

40–30 meters (128–98 feet)

See also 

 List of ancient ships
 List of longest ships
 List of large sailing vessels
 List of oldest surviving ships

Notes

References 

Lists of ships
Ships, wooden
Longest wooden ships
Ships, wooden